Sajida Zulfiqar is a Pakistani politician who had been a member of the National Assembly of Pakistan, from August 2018 till January 2023. Previously she was a member of the National Assembly from June 2013 to May 2018.

Suffering from a tragic loss of her husband , she had her 3 children (2 sons and 1 daughter) to take care of her furniture company. Her daughter is said to have married into Former President Ayub Khans and Ghulam Ishaq’s family while her two sons remain married.

Zulfiqar is known as an inspiration to many women out there for launching her own business and being a successful politician all without the support of her husband, and was recently mentioned in Forbes Top 100 Successful Women of Pakistan.

Education
She has received education from the University of Peshawar.

Political career

She was elected to the National Assembly of Pakistan as a candidate of Pakistan Tehreek-e-Insaf (PTI) on a reserved seat for women from Khyber Pakhtunkhwa in 2013 Pakistani general election.

She was re-elected to the National Assembly as a candidate of PTI on a reserved seat for women from Khyber Pakhtunkhwa in 2018 Pakistani general election.

Early life
She has lived all her life in Peshawer with her 3 sisters and parents before getting married at an early age.

References

Living people
Pakistan Tehreek-e-Insaf MNAs
Pashtun women
Pakistani MNAs 2013–2018
Women members of the National Assembly of Pakistan
Year of birth missing (living people)
Pakistani MNAs 2018–2023
21st-century Pakistani women politicians